Muscle car is a description according to Merriam-Webster Dictionary that came to use in 1966 for "a group of American-made two-door sports coupes with powerful engines designed for high-performance driving." The Britannica Dictionary describes these as "an American-made two-door sports car with a powerful engine."

Although the term was unknown for another fifteen-plus years, General Motors is credited by some as introducing the first "intentional" muscle car in 1949, when it put its  Rocket V8 from its full-sized luxury car 98 model into the considerably smaller and lighter Oldsmobile 88. The competition between American manufacturers started when Chrysler installed the  Chrysler Hemi engine in the mid-range Chrysler Saratoga in 1951 that was normally installed in the full-sized luxury sedan Chrysler New Yorker. In 1952 Ford's luxury brand Lincoln introduced the  Lincoln Y-Block V8 and the rivalry began, where the Lincoln Capri was entered in the Pan American Road Race in both 1952 and 1953, and taking first and second place in 1954. This was followed by both the Oldsmobile 88 and Chrysler Saratoga being raced in stock form at NASCAR races across the country.

By some accounts, the "muscle car" term proper was originally applied to mid-1960s and early 1970s special editions of mass-production cars which were designed for drag racing, though it shortly entered the general vocabulary through car magazines and automobile marketing and became used generically for "performance"-oriented street cars.

By some period definitions and perceptions, the term muscle car came to connote high performance at budget prices, where extremely powerful engines were put into relatively bare-bones intermediate cars at extremely affordable prices. This wave, exemplified by the 1968 Plymouth Road Runner and companion Dodge Super Bee, were meant to undercut more expensive, more stylish, and better-appointed cars by General Motors and Ford that had come to define the market, such as the Pontiac GTO (1964), 396 Chevrolet Chevelle (1965), 400 Buick Gran Sport (1965), 400 Oldsmobile 442 (1965), as well as 427 Mercury Comet Cyclone (1964) and 390 Mercury Cyclone (1966). The Dodge and Plymouth cars also continued the performance tradition started at Chrysler with the full-sized Chrysler 300L when production ended in 1965.

By some definitions – including those used by Car and Driver and Road and Track magazines cited below, pony cars such as the Ford Mustang, Chevrolet Camaro and the Plymouth Barracuda and their luxury companions Mercury Cougar, Pontiac Firebird and the Dodge Challenger in that large, influential, and lucrative 1960s-70s niche, could also qualify as "muscle cars" if outfitted with suitable high-performance equipment.

Terminology

Definition 

The definition of a muscle car is subjective and endlessly debated. Muscle cars often have many of the following characteristics:
 A large V8 engine in the most powerful configuration offered for a particular model
 Rear-wheel drive
 Being manufactured in the United States in the 1960s or early 1970s (the specific year range of 1964–1973 is sometimes used)
 A relatively lightweight two-door body (though opinions vary as to whether high-performance full-size cars, compacts, and pony cars qualify as muscle cars, and why a 2-seat AMC AMX could be, but a 2-seat Chevrolet Corvette was not. It is sometimes claimed that only mid-size cars can be considered muscle cars.)
 Focused on delivering performance on the street that could also be used for drag racing.

High-power pony cars are sometimes considered muscle cars, however, personal luxury cars are often too expensive to be considered by some to be muscle cars. Sports cars are not considered muscle cars by some definitions. By some narrow definitions, muscle cars are an extension of the hot rodding philosophy of taking a small car and putting a large-displacement engine in it, for the purpose of increasing straight-line speed. However, that is repudiated by the much broader public acceptance and use of the term as exemplified by the Car and Driver and Road and Track magazine top muscle car lists below, which display a much broader interpretation of the term.

Supercars 
Muscle cars were originally referred to as "Supercars" in the United States, often (though not always) spelled with a capital S." From the mid-1960s to the mid-1970s, "dragstrip bred" mid-size cars equipped with large V8 engines and rear-wheel drive were referred to as Supercars more often than muscle cars. An early example is the 1957 Rambler Rebel, which was described as a "potent mill turned the lightweight Rambler into a veritable supercar."

In 1966 the supercar became an "industry trend" as the four domestic automakers "needed to cash in on the supercar market" with eye-catching, heart-stopping cars. Examples of the use of the supercar description for the early muscle models include the May 1965 Car Life road test of the Pontiac GTO along with how "Hurst puts American Motors into the Supercar club with the 390 Rogue" (the SC/Rambler) to fight in "the Supercar street racer gang" market segment, with the initials "SC" signifying SuperCar.

The supercar market segment in the U.S. at the time included special versions of regular production models that were positioned in several sizes and market segments (such as the "economy supercar"), as well as limited edition, documented dealer-converted vehicles. However, the supercar term by that time "had been diluted and branded with a meaning that did not respect the unique qualities of the 'muscle car'."

History

1950s: Origins 

Opinions on the origin of the muscle car vary, but the 1949 Oldsmobile Rocket 88, is cited as the first full-sized muscle car. The Rocket 88 was the first time a powerful V8 engine was available in a smaller and lighter body style (in this case the  engine from the larger Oldsmobile 98 with the body from the six-cylinder Oldsmobile 76). The Rocket 88's Oldsmobile 303 V8 engine (along with the Cadillac 331 engine, also introduced in 1949) are stated to have "launched the modern era of the high-performance V-8."

In 1955, the large-sized Chrysler C-300 - the first in a long, 15-year series of large, expensive, performance-first Chryslers - was introduced that produced  from its  V8 engine, and it was advertised as "America's Most Powerful Car".

The compact-sized 1956 Studebaker Golden Hawk was powered by a   Packard V8, the second most powerful engine to the Chrysler 300.

The Rambler Rebel, introduced by American Motors Corporation (AMC) in 1957, is the first mid-sized car to be available with a big-block V8 engine. The Rebel followed most of the muscle car formula including "make 'em go fast as well as cheaply." It is therefore considered by some to be the first muscle car. With a  V8 engine producing , its 0–60 mph acceleration of 7.5 seconds made it the fastest stock American sedan at the time. Only the fuel-injected Chevrolet Corvette beat it by half a second.

Early 1960s: Drag racing influences 

The popularity and performance of muscle cars grew in the early 1960s, as Mopar (Dodge, Plymouth, and Chrysler) and Ford battled for supremacy in drag racing. The 1961 Chevrolet Impala offered an SS package for $53.80, which consisted of a  V8 engine producing  along with upgraded brakes, tires, and suspension. The 1962 Dodge Dart 413 (nicknamed Max Wedge) had a  V8 which produced  and could cover the quarter-mile in under 13 seconds.

In 1963, two hundred Ford Galaxie "R-code" cars were factory-built specifically for drag racing, resulting in a full-size car that could cover the quarter-mile in a little over 12 seconds. The road-legal version of the Galaxie 427 used the "Q-code" engine which produced . The following year, Ford installed the proven 427 "top-oiler" engine in the smaller and lighter Fairlane body, creating the Ford Thunderbolt. The Thunderbolt included several weight-saving measures (including acrylic windows and fibreglass/aluminium body panels and bumpers) and a stock Thunderbolt could cover the quarter-mile in 11.76 seconds. The Thunderbolt was technically road-legal, however, it was considered unsuitable even "for driving to and from the (drag)strip, let alone on the street in everyday use". A total of 111 Thunderbolts were built.

The General Motors competitor to the Thunderbolt was the Z-11 option package for the full-size Chevrolet Impala coupe, of which 57 examples were produced in 1963 only. With a compression ratio of 13.5:1, the engine required high-octane fuel. The RPOZ-11 package also included weight reduction measures such as an aluminum hood and fenders, the removal of sound-deadening material as well as the deletion of the heater and radio.

In 1964, a drag racing version of the Dodge 330 was created, called the "330 Lightweight". Weight reduction measures included an aluminium hood, lightweight front bumpers, fenders and doors, polycarbonate
side windows, and no sound deadening. Like other lightweights of the era, it came with a factory disclaimer: "Designed for supervised acceleration trials. Not recommended for general everyday driving because of the compromises in the all-round characteristics which must be made for this type of vehicle."

Also using the 426 Hemi racing engine was the limited production 1965 Plymouth Satellite 426 Hemi. In 1966, the racing version of the 426 Hemi was replaced by a detuned "Street Hemi" version, also with a size of 426 cu in and an official power rating of ).

1964–1970: Peak muscle car era 

Although muscle cars sold in relatively small volumes, manufacturers valued the halo effect of the publicity created by these models.

The Pontiac GTO, a car that captured the public mind and strongly influenced the muscle car era, was introduced in 1964 as an optional package for the intermediate-size Pontiac Tempest. The GTO was developed by Pontiac division president John DeLorean and was initially powered by a  V8 engine producing . The success of the GTO led other GM divisions to develop muscle cars based on intermediate-sized platforms: the 1964 Oldsmobile 442, 1964 Chevrolet Chevelle SS, and 1965 Buick Gran Sport.

AMC was a car manufacturing company that made these two incredible cars. AMC only made small economy cars until they hired Dick Teague as a designer, who later became the vice president. AMC wasn't known for being in the top competitors for manufacturing cars, but when they came out with the AMX and the Javelin they became one of the top competitors.

As the 1960s progressed, optional equipment and luxury appointments increased in many popular models of "performance-oriented" cars. With the added weight and power-consuming accessories and features, engines had to be more powerful to maintain performance levels, and the cars became more expensive. In response, some "budget" muscle cars began to appear, such as the 1967 Plymouth GTX, the 1968 Plymouth Road Runner, and the 1968 Dodge Super Bee. In 1969, the Plymouth Road Runner was awarded Motor Trend magazine's Car of the Year. In this customized form, the cost of the Road Runner was US$3,893.

The Plymouth Barracuda was a pony car that could be turned into a muscle car with the addition of the famed Chrysler 426 Hemi, available as an option beginning in 1968, after debuting in street form two years earlier in the Plymouth Belvedere, Dodge Coronet, and Dodge Charger. Originally based on the smaller compact car body and chassis of the Plymouth Valiant, the Barracuda was also available with a  V8 engine producing . It could run a quarter-mile in 13.33 seconds at on the drag strip. The base price was $2,796.00; the price as tested by Hot Rod was $3,652. The related 1970 Plymouth Duster was powered by a  V8 engine producing .

The  Chevrolet L72 big-block engine became available in the mid-sized Chevrolet Chevelle in 1969 as the COPO 427 option. The 427 Chevelle could run a 13.3 sec. quarter-mile at.

The fastest muscle car produced by American Motors was the mid-sized 1970 AMC Rebel "The Machine", which was powered by a  engine producing .

1970s: Decline of the segment 
The popularity of muscle cars declined through the early 1970s, due to factors including the Clean Air Act, the fuel crisis and increasing insurance costs. The 1973 oil crisis resulted in rationing of fuel and higher prices. Muscle cars quickly became unaffordable and impractical for many people. In addition, the automobile insurance industry levied surcharges on all high-powered models.

Before the Clean Air Act of 1970, a majority of muscle cars came optioned with high-compression engines (some engines were as high as 11:1), which required high-octane fuel. Before the oil embargo, 100-octane fuel was common. However, following the passage of the Clean Air Act of 1970, octane ratings were lowered to 91 (due in part to the removal of lead). Manufacturers reduced the compression ratio of engines, resulting in reduced performance. Simultaneously, efforts to combat air pollution focused Detroit's attention on emissions control rather than increased power outputs.

1980s–1990s: Performance revival 

Muscle car performance began a resurgence in the early 1980s with high output V8 engines introduced for the Ford Mustang GT, Chevrolet Camaro Z28, and Pontiac Firebird Formula/Trans Am. Initially using four-barrel carburetors, engine performance and fuel economy were increased by the mid-1980s using electronic fuel injection systems and advanced engine management controls. Muscle car performance began to reappear on intermediate two-door coupés such as the Chevrolet Monte Carlo SS and Buick Regal. The Buick Regal used turbocharged V6 engines on the Grand National, Turbo-T, T-Type, and GNX models which rivaled the performance of V8 engines.

The few muscle cars remaining in production by the mid-1990s included the fourth generation Mustang, fourth generation Camaro, and fourth generation Firebird.

2000s – present 

For the 2004 model year, the Pontiac GTO was relaunched in the United States as a rebadged captive import version of the Holden Monaro. The model was to recreate the past versions, but the new version "was nothing like the old aggressive and evocative model from the 60s" and it was discontinued in 2006.

For 2005, Chrysler introduced muscle car heritage to high-performance V8-powered versions of four-door sedans, the Dodge Charger and Chrysler 300C, using nameplates traditionally used for two-door muscle cars. 

For 2005, the fifth-generation Ford Mustang, designed to resemble the original first-generation Mustang, brought back the aggressive lines and colors of the original. 

For the 2006 model year, GM relaunched the Chevrolet Monte Carlo SS with the first V8 engine on the Monte Carlo in 15 Years. The same V8 was used on the Monte Carlo's W-Body sister cars like the Pontiac Grand Prix GXP, Buick Lacrosse Super, and the Chevrolet Impala SS. All Monte Carlo production ended on June 19, 2007, because of declining sales of coupe models in general as well as Chevrolet's plan to reintroduce a new Camaro.

For 2008, Chrysler re-introduced the Dodge Challenger, which features styling links to the 1970 first-generation Challenger and was claimed by the Chrysler CEO to be "a modern take on one of the most iconic muscle cars". 

A year later, running on that same sentiment, Chevrolet released the 2009 Camaro, which bears some resemblance to the 1969 first-generation Camaro.

Australia 

The first Australian-designed car to be marketed as a performance model was the 1963 Holden EH S4 model, of which 120 road cars were produced so that the model could be eligible to compete at the 1963 Armstrong 500 motor race at Bathurst. In 1964, the Ford Falcon (XM) became available with an enlarged  "Super Pursuit" version of the standard six-cylinder engine, which produced .

In 1965, the Chrysler Valiant AP6 became the first Australian car to be available with a V8 engine. This optional engine was the  version of the Chrysler LA engine, which produced  and was imported from the United States. The first Australian-designed Ford to be available with a V8 was the 1966 Ford Falcon (XR), with a  version of the Ford Windsor engine (imported from the United States), which produced . The first Holden to be available with a V8 was the 1968 Holden HK, with a  version of the Chevrolet small-block V8 (imported from the United States) which produced . Later that year, a  version of the engine became available in the Holden HK Monaro GTS 327 coupe.

The pinnacle of 1970s Australian muscle cars were the 1971–1972 Ford Falcon GTHO, Holden Monaro 350, and Chrysler Valiant Charger R/T (the smaller Holden Torana GTR was also a successful performance car of the era, but it is not considered a muscle car due to its prioritisation of lighter weight over outright power output). The Holden HQ Monaro GTS 350 was powered by a  version of the Chevrolet small-block V8 producing . The Chrysler Valiant Charger R/T E49 model was powered by a  version of the Chrysler Hemi-6 six-cylinder engine producing .

In 1972, production of Australian muscle cars saw a setback when the Supercar scare caused Ford, Holden, and Chrysler to cease development of upcoming performance models, due to government pressure. The Australian muscle car models produced during the 1970s later consisted of the limited production 1977–1978 Holden Torana (LX) A9X option and the 1978–1979 Ford Falcon (XC) Cobra model, both created as homologation models for Group C touring car racing. These were less powerful than their predecessors.  

Brands still offered high-performance models with V8 variants throughout the 1980s, but these vehicles were not produced in significant quantity, and were generally underpowered compared to their late-1960s and 1970s predecessors. An example was the Ford_Falcon_(XD), which was available with a 5.8 L V8 engine. Subsequent generations of the Ford Falcon would not have any V8 options available. The Holden Commodore, which debuted in However, a renaissance in muscle cars would be sparked by factory-backed aftermarket operations. Holden Dealer Team would release high-performance models of the Holden Commodore throughout the 1980s, such as the HDT Group A, which would become iconic for its blue paintwork.
 In 1988, Ford released the Ford Falcon (EB), which was available with a V8 in a 25th anniversary special model celebrating the original Ford Falcon GT.

Argentina 

In Argentina, Chevrolet and Dodge produced two highly acclaimed models of muscle cars. The first was the producer of the third American generation of the Chevrolet Nova, which in this country was renamed Chevy. This model was initially presented in a 4-door sedan version that maintained many physical features of the Nova coupe version, which would also be produced and marketed in Argentina a few years later. While Dodge produced in Argentina a series of vehicles based on the fourth generation of the Dodge Dart and that received the name of Línea Dodge (Dodge Line). This vehicle presented sedan and coupe versions, which in turn were a local redesign of the Dart model and which, depending on its level of equipment, received different names (Polara, Coronado, RT and GTX). In return for these brands, both Ford and the national producer IKA would respond with the production of two high-performance sedans, such as the Argentine version of the Ford Falcon and a derivative of the Rambler American model, called IKA Torino, which, in addition to its sedan version, would present a coupe version which would end up being highly acclaimed and popularized in the Argentine automotive field.

Lists of muscle cars (1963–1973) 

According to Car & Driver Magazine, January 1990: 

 1964–1969 Pontiac GTO 
 1966–1971 Plymouth/Dodge A-body 426 models
 1966–1967 Chevy Nova SS 327
 1966–1969 Chevy Chevelle SS 396
 1968–1969 Chevy Nova SS 396
 1969 Ford Torino Cobra 428
 1969 Plymouth Road Runner 440 Six Pack
 1969 Dodge Super Bee 440 Six Pack
 1969 Chevrolet Camaro COPO ZL-1
 1970 Chevy Chevelle SS 454

According to Road & Track Magazine, February 2019: 

 1963 Studebaker Superlark
 1964 Ford Fairlane Thunderbolt
 1967 Dodge Coronet WO23 GSX Stage 1
 1969-1970 Ford Mustang Boss 429
 1970 AMC "The Machine"
 1970–1971 Plymouth Barracuda 426
 1971–1973 Ford Mustang Mach 1 Drag Pack

See also 
 Sport compact
 Supercar
 Pony car

References

External links 
 

 
Cars introduced in 1949
Car classifications